The National Railway Museum of Pietrarsa lies beside the Naples–Portici railway, between the city of Naples and the towns of Portici and San Giorgio a Cremano. Pietrarsa is an area among these villages in the past known as “Pietra Bianca” (white stone) but it was renamed Pietrarsa (burnt stone) after the eruption of the Vesuvius in 1631.

The museum is housed in what was originally the old Bourbon workshop Officine di Pietrarsa, founded in 1840 at the command of Ferdinand II of Bourbon where steam machines for ships and boilers for locomotives were built. The workshop was organized in pavilions (where the collection is today displayed) which housed the various departments, each specializing in a different part of the production cycle.

Overview
In 1830, Ferdinand became king of the Kingdom of the two Sicilies. At the beginning, he had a small factory built in Torre Annunziata to produce steam engines for ships and ammunition for military use. This factory was part of the so many projects he undertook to renovate the Kingdom. Ferdinand II wanted to abandon the reactionary politics of his predecessors; he wanted to emancipate his Kingdom from foreign industrial and technological supremacy.

In 1837, Ferdinand decided to relocate the factory, in order to better oversee the operations, and it was transferred next to the Royal Palace of Naples. The year 1836 was so important for Italy and Italian railways. The King met the French engineer Armand Bayard, who proposed to build the first stretch of line from Naples to Nocera. On 3 October 1839, the first part of that line, from Naples to Portici, was inaugurated. Two locomotives arrived from England on this occasion: the Longridge and the Vesuvio, while the locomotive called Bayard arrived on December of the same year.

The development of the railways was so important that soon the King faced the problem of having a larger space to build a new  and bigger workshop. He opted for Pietrarsa where, in 1842, the Royal Workshop for Mechanical works, nautical and locomotive production was born. The workshop run at full speed: in the middle of the 19th century it employed 1,100 workers and it became the largest industrial pole in Italy.

With the unification of Italy, the production was taken over by industry in the north, the Bourbon realm fell and Pietrarsa was handed over to the Italian Government first and to private companies later.  These companies started a restrictions policy that caused a fall of the production and protests among workers.

After World War II, the emergence of diesel and electric traction resulted in the rapid decline of steam locomotives and the decline of the factory too. In 1975, the Workshop of Pietrarsa was closed because it didn’t meet the new technical needs. The location underwent some restoration and, on 7 October 1989, the National Railway Museum of Pietrarsa was officially inaugurated.

Structure 
The size of the National Railway Museum of Pietrarsa  (36.000 m2) and the quantity of rolling stock exhibited places it amongst the major railway museums in the world. The collection is displayed in the pavilions of the ancient factory.

The pavilion A, once used for assembly and reparation of locomotives, displays 26 steam locomotives and 4 three-phase electric locomotives. The most famous piece is a reproduction of the Bayard locomotive, the twin of Vesuvio. It was built in 1939 for the 100th Anniversary of the Naples-Portici line. Along the walls the  steam locomotives are displayed following the evolution of steam traction. Then, here is the “Franco-Crosti”, the 910 and 740 locomotives.

The pavilions B and C housed the furnaces and now are displayed many carriages (a Centoporte wagon, three Littorine, the E.623 and E.626) One important example is the n.10 of the Royal Train built by Fiat for the marriage of Umberto II of Savoy and Maria José of Belgium. It was one of 11 wagons and is renowned for its internal furnishing.

The Pavilion D housed the forges and today there are diesel locomotives, while the Pavilion E is dedicated to the cinema hall and the pavilion F showcases a selection of giant machinery from the old factory.
The last Pavilion is the oldest one, built in 1840. It is known as “Cathedral” because of its arches. It displays train models and railway memorabilia as the famous Trecentotreni model.

Sources
Centro Relazioni Aziendali FS (a cura di), Da Pietrarsa e Granili a Santa Maria La Bruna, Napoli-Roma, 1971
Museo Nazionale Ferroviario di Napoli Pietrarsa. Riuso musealistico delle antiche officine borboniche, Roma, Ferrovie dello Stato, 1982  
AGF, Da Pietrarsa a Pietrarsa. Storia e immagini del treno italiano, Roma, 1990
A. Tanzillo (a cura di ), Il Museo Nazionale Ferroviario di Pietrarsa, (s.l. e s.d.)
Gian Guido Turchi, 150 anni e un museo, in I Treni 99,1989

External links
Pietrarsa railway museum Official website.
 List of locomotives in the museum.

Railway
Railway museums
Museums in Naples
Transport in Campania
Museums established in 1989
Railway museums in Italy
National museums of Italy